Return Engagement, also known as Hong Kong Corruptor is a 1990 Hong Kong action drama film directed by Joe Cheung and starring Alan Tang, Elizabeth Lee, May Lo and Simon Yam, with a guest appearance by Andy Lau.

Plot
Return Engagement tells the story of Lung (Alan Tang), a Triad boss who is sent to prison in Canada. While he is in jail his daughter is taken to Hong Kong to keep her safe. On his release Lung travels to Hong Kong to find his daughter where he meets a young Triad, Wah (Andy Lau) who knows of his reputation and respects him greatly.

Alternate versions
The film was released on VHS in North America as Hong Kong Corruptor, featuring an unrelated scene with Chow Yun-fat. This meant to cash in on the success of American film debuts made by Asian filmmakers, such as John Woo as well as superstars such as Chow Yun-Fat.

Cast 
 Alan Tang as Lung Ho-tin
 Andy Lau as Wah (guest appearance)
 Simon Yam as Lee Pang
 Elizabeth Lee as Tsim Siu-fung
 Carrie Ng as Lung's wife
 Ku Feng as Uncle Hung
 Melvin Wong as Officer Wong
 Dennis Chan as Hotel manager
 May Lo as Little Lung
 David Wu as David
 Chang Yi as Toilet repairman
 Anthony Pa as Lee Pang's thug

References

External links

 Hong Kong Cinemagic entry

1990 films
1990s Cantonese-language films
1990 crime drama films
1990s action films
Gun fu films
Hong Kong action films
Hong Kong gangster films
Triad films
Films set in Hong Kong
Films shot in Hong Kong
Films set in Vancouver
Films shot in Vancouver
1990s Hong Kong films